The R737 road is a regional road in County Wexford, Ireland. It travels from the R733 road at Haggard to the pier at Duncannon.

References

Regional roads in the Republic of Ireland
Roads in County Wexford